Papafi is an under-construction metro station serving Thessaloniki Metro's Line 1 and Line 2. The station is named after the Ioannis Papafis, a Thessaloniki-born merchant, entrepreneur, and national benefactor of Greece. The station is built within the grounds of the Papafio Orphanage, a male-only orphanage financed by Papafis and operated by the Metropolis of Thessaloniki. Construction of this station has been held back by conflicts between the Metropolis and Attiko Metro, the company overseeing its construction. It is expected to enter service in 2023.

This station also appears in the 1988 Thessaloniki Metro proposal. In earlier iterations of the Thessaloniki Metro Development Plan, Papafi station is shown as a starting point for an extension of Line 1 to  through Toumba, but this has been abandoned as of 2018.

References

See also
List of Thessaloniki Metro stations

Thessaloniki Metro